Jaroslav Fikejz (24 April 1927 – 26 December 2008) was a Czech athlete. He competed in the men's long jump at the 1948 Summer Olympics.

References

1927 births
2008 deaths
Athletes (track and field) at the 1948 Summer Olympics
Czech male long jumpers
Olympic athletes of Czechoslovakia